Shamel's horseshoe bat (Rhinolophus shameli) is a species of bat in the family Rhinolophidae. It is found in Cambodia, Laos, Myanmar, Thailand and Vietnam.

The eponym for the species name "shameli" was American mammalogist H. Harold Shamel.

References

Rhinolophidae
Mammals described in 1843
Taxonomy articles created by Polbot
Taxa named by George Henry Hamilton Tate
Bats of Southeast Asia